Markus Hayer (born 18 August 1985) is a German footballer who plays for VfR Marienhagen 1930.

Career

Hayer played in the youth team of Bayer Leverkusen, but made his breakthrough in senior football with seven years at Germania Dattenfeld (later renamed Germania Windeck). In 2010, he signed for Kickers Offenbach of the 3. Liga, and made his debut in a surprise 3–0 win over VfL Bochum in the first round of the DFB-Pokal, as a late substitute for Olivier Occean. After two years without fully establishing himself at Offenbach, he signed for 1. FC Saarbrücken in July 2012. He was released by Saarbrücken in January 2014, after an injury-hit eighteen months with the club, and returned to his first club, signing for Bayer Leverkusen II. He left Leverkusen for a second time when the club disbanded its reserve team at the end of the 2013–14 season.

References

External links

1985 births
Living people
German footballers
Kickers Offenbach players
1. FC Saarbrücken players
Bayer 04 Leverkusen II players
3. Liga players

Association football midfielders